Katoya Lake is located in Glacier National Park, in the U. S. state of Montana. The lake is 0.25 miles (0.40 km) long and 0.10 miles (0.16 km) wide. Its surface elevation is 6,368 ft (1,941 m).

See also
List of lakes in Glacier County, Montana

References

Lakes of Glacier National Park (U.S.)
Lakes of Glacier County, Montana